Sulaiman Said Saif Al-Shukaili (born 29 October 1984), commonly known as Sulaiman Al-Shukaili, is an Omani footballer who plays for Muscat Club in the Oman First Division League.

Club career statistics

International career
Sulaiman was selected for the Oman national football team for the first time in 2006. He has represented the national team in the 2007 AFC Asian Cup qualification, the 2007 AFC Asian Cup and the 2011 AFC Asian Cup qualification

He also played at the 2001 FIFA U-17 World Championship in Trinidad and Tobago.

External links
 
 
 
 

1984 births
Living people
Omani footballers
Oman international footballers
Omani expatriate footballers
Association football defenders
2007 AFC Asian Cup players
Muscat Club players
Al Salmiya SC players
Expatriate footballers in Kuwait
Omani expatriate sportspeople in Kuwait
Footballers at the 2006 Asian Games
Asian Games competitors for Oman
Kuwait Premier League players